South Carolina Highway 80 (SC 80) is a  primary state highway in the state of South Carolina. The highway serves as a bypass, connecting SC 14 to U.S. Route 29 (US 29) in Greer.

Route description
SC 80 is a four-lane expressway, which begins at SC 14, on the backside of the Greenville-Spartanburg International Airport. Going in a northeasterly direction, the first  include a narrow median before splitting into a divided highway. The highway ends at US 29 (Wade Hampton Boulevard). The highway is shared with truck routes of SC 101 and SC 290.

History
The second incarnation of SC 80 was established in July 2002 as a new primary route running from SC 101 to US 29. In April 2005 it was extended to SC 14.

The first SC 80 existed from 1937 to 1962 as a new primary route from SC 181 in Fair Play to SC 18 in Anderson. It was decommissioned after Lake Hartwell formed a gap in the highway with the westernmost part becoming part of SC 243 and the rest becoming Old Dobbins Bridge Road (S-4-22 and S-4-23).

Major intersections

See also

References

External links

080
Transportation in Greenville County, South Carolina
Transportation in Spartanburg County, South Carolina
Greer, South Carolina